The Rmam people are a small ethnic group in Vietnam (639 in 2019). They speak a language in the Central Bahnaric branch of the Mon–Khmer family. They mostly reside in Le Village, Mo Rai Commune, Kon Tum. Hunting, Gathering, Agriculture, and Weaving are the main sources of wealth in current Ro Mam society.

See also
 List of ethnic groups in Vietnam

References

External links
Ethnologue entry for Romam language

Ethnic groups in Vietnam